Gökçekaya Dam is   north  of Alpu town  east of province of Eskişehir  in central Turkey and located  downstream of Sarıyar Dam on the Sakarya River which runs into the Black Sea. The Yenice Dam is located downstream.

There is a hydroelectric power plant, established in 1972, at the dam, with a power output of 278 MW (three Francis turbines at 92.8 MW each), generating an average 562 GW·h of hydroelectricity annually.

References

External links

Dams in Eskişehir Province
Hydroelectric power stations in Turkey
Dams completed in 1972
Energy infrastructure completed in 1972
Arch dams